Billy Fox may refer to:

 Billy Fox (politician) (1939–1974), Irish Fine Gael politician
 Billy Fox (boxer) (1926–1986), American light heavyweight boxer

See also
Billie Fox, married name of English actress and singer Billie Piper
William Fox (disambiguation)
Bill Fox (disambiguation)